Chen Wen-ling (born 16 August 1994) is a Taiwanese freestyle wrestler. She competed in the women's freestyle 69 kg event at the 2016 Summer Olympics, in which she was eliminated in the round of 16 by Ochirbatyn Nasanburmaa.

References

External links
 

1994 births
Living people
Taiwanese female sport wrestlers
Olympic wrestlers of Taiwan
Wrestlers at the 2016 Summer Olympics
Wrestlers at the 2014 Asian Games
Wrestlers at the 2018 Asian Games
Asian Games competitors for Chinese Taipei
21st-century Taiwanese women